Alyxandria Treasure (born May 15, 1992 in Prince George, British Columbia) is a Canadian track and field athlete competing in the high jump. She competed in the high jump event at the 2015 Pan American Games in Toronto, where she finished 7th.

In 2016, she jumped her personal best of 1.93, thereby qualifying for the Olympic team. She placed 17th in the Rio de Janeiro Olympics.

Personal best

Achievements

References

External links

1992 births
Living people
Athletes (track and field) at the 2015 Pan American Games
Pan American Games track and field athletes for Canada
Sportspeople from Prince George, British Columbia
Canadian female high jumpers
Athletes (track and field) at the 2016 Summer Olympics
Olympic track and field athletes of Canada
World Athletics Championships athletes for Canada
Athletes (track and field) at the 2018 Commonwealth Games
Commonwealth Games competitors for Canada